Simon Tedeschi (born 1 May 1981) is an Australian classical pianist and writer.

Early life 
Tedeschi was born in Gosford to Mark Tedeschi QC, Senior Crown Prosecutor for New South Wales, and doctor Vivienne Tedeschi, the daughter of a Polish Holocaust survivor, Lucy Gershwin. 

Raised in a Reform Jewish household, he grew up on the North Shore of Sydney and attended Beaumont Road Public School in West Killara and St Andrew's Cathedral School in Sydney where the headmaster discouraged him from taking part in sports lest he damage his hands.

His teachers were Neta Maughan in Australia, Noretta Conci in England and Peter Serkin in USA.

When he was 9 years old, Tedeschi performed Mozart's Piano Concerto No. 19, K.459 in the Sydney Opera House. At age 13, he played for Luciano Pavarotti.

Career 

Tedeschi signed with Sony Music Australia in 2000. His debut CD, Simon Tedeschi, was nominated for at the ARIA Music Awards of 2000 for Best Classical Album. In 2004 he recorded Tchaikovsky's 1st Piano Concerto and Grieg's Piano Concerto with the Queensland Symphony Orchestra with Richard Bonynge. His album, Grieg / Tchaikovsky – Piano Concertos, peaked at No. 12 on the ARIA Classical chart in October 2005.

In November 2012 he released his next album, Gershwin and Me (Universal Music Group/ABC), which reached No. 4 on the ARIA Classical, No. 5 on the ARIA Hitseekers Albums, No. 68 on the ARIA Top 100 Physical Albums charts in January 2013. In that year, a follow up album, Gershwin Take 2, by Tedeschi with James Morrison and Sarah McKenzie was issued. It received two ARIA Award nominations in 2014 for Virginia Read's work as engineer and producer.

He released a recording of Mussorgsky's Pictures at an Exhibition for ABC/Universal and performed Rachmaninoff's Piano concerto no. 4 with the Sydney Symphony Orchestra.

Media 
He appeared regularly on the TV show Spicks and Specks on ABC TV, and he participated in the Oscar-winning movie Shine, where he played the hands of David Helfgott.

Writing 

In 2022, Tedeschi published his first book entitled Fugitive, an unclassifiable work encompassing prose poetry, philosophy, memoir, meditation, aphorism and essay; the title is a reference to Prokofiev's collection of piano miniatures, Visions fugitives. It was shortlisted for the 2023 Victorian Premier's Prize for Poetry. In May 2022, Tedeschi was announced as the winner of the Australian Book Reviews Calibre Prize for his essay "This woman my grandmother".

Work for children 
He played the role of Mozart in Sydney Opera House's Babies Proms, and performed a show based on his childhood, Simon Tedeschi: Pianist and Prankster at the Monkey Baa Theatre Company.

Personal life 
Tedeschi currently lives in Sydney with his wife, painter Loribelle Spirovski.

Discography

Albums

Awards 
Tedeschi was awarded the ABC Young Performer of the Year in 1998, performing the Ginastera Piano Concerto no. 1 with the Melbourne Symphony Orchestra under the baton of Jun Markl. He was also the winner of the top prize in the keyboard section of the Royal Overseas League Music Competition in London (2002).

In January 2001 Tedeschi was awarded a Centenary of Federation Medal by the then Prime Minister of Australia John Howard with a citation, "For service as a Young Australian of the Year Finalist."

ARIA Music Awards
The ARIA Music Awards is an annual awards ceremony that recognises excellence, innovation, and achievement across all genres of Australian music. They commenced in 1987. 

! 
|-
| 2000
| Simon Tedeschi
| Best Classical Album
| 
|rowspan="2" | 
|-
| 2006
| Piano Concertos: Tchaikovsky, Grieg (with The Queensland Orchestra & Richard Bonynge)
| Best Classical Album
| 
|-
|rowspan="2" | 2014
|rowspan="2" | Virginia Read for Gershwin: Take Two
| Engineer of the Year
| 
|rowspan="2" |
|-
| Producer of the Year
| 
|-

References

External links

"Simon Tedeschi: hearing a different beat" by Sharon Verghis, The Australian, 3 July 2010
"Piano star Simon Tedeschi shares the keys to his success in school holiday show" by Chris Hook, The Daily Telegraph, 20 September 2014

 his transcription of Danny Elfman's theme for The Simpsons

1981 births
Living people
People from Gosford
Musicians from Sydney
Australian classical pianists
Male classical pianists
Recipients of the Centenary Medal
21st-century classical pianists
21st-century Australian male musicians
21st-century Australian musicians